The 2016 Indonesia Soccer Championship U-21 season was the first and only edition of Indonesia Soccer Championship U-21, a competition that is intended for footballers under the age of twenty-one years. This season's participants are the U-21 teams of 2016 Indonesia Soccer Championship A teams except for Sriwijaya F.C., that withdrew from the tournament.

PS TNI won the title on 13 December 2016 after defeating Bali United 6-1 in the final.

Format 
The competition is divided into four acts consist of two group stages and two knockout rounds, which is the semifinals and final. On the first stage, the teams are divided into three groups each containing six clubs, the top two teams of each group and the two best third place will advance to the second stage. The second stage consists of two groups containing four teams in each group, the best team from each group and the best runner-up will advance to the semifinals. The winner of the semifinals will advance to the final to battle for the championship.

Only players born on or after 1 March 1995 are eligible to compete in the tournament.

Personnel and stadium 

Note: Flags indicate national team as has been defined under FIFA eligibility rules. Managers may hold more than one non-FIFA nationality.

First round 
First stage of the group stage will be started on 12 August 2016, except for Group 3 will be started on 31 August 2016 All groups will play home and away round-robin tournament, with the exception of Group 3 which will play home tournament round-robin.

Group 1

Group 2

Group 3

Ranking of third-placed teams
To search for the two best teams, a mechanism that respects the principle of equality is used. Because Group 1 contains only five teams while Groups 2 and 3 filled with six teams, the results achieved by the third-placed teams in final standings of Group 2 and 3 against bottom-placed teams in their group didn't count.

Second round 
The second round will be held on 2–7 December 2016. All groups will play half season round-robin tournament.

Group X
All matches will be held in Kapten I Wayan Dipta Stadium, Gianyar Regency

Group Y
All matches will be held in Gelora Bumi Kartini Stadium, Jepara

Knockout stage

Semifinals

Third Place

Final

Champions

See also
2016 Indonesia Soccer Championship A
2016 Indonesia Soccer Championship B
2016 Liga Nusantara
2016 Soeratin Cup

References

External links
 Official Website

2016 in Indonesian sport